Hao is the Mandarin pinyin and Wade–Giles romanization of the Chinese surname written  in Chinese characters. It is listed 77th in the Song dynasty classic text Hundred Family Surnames. As of 2008, it is the 82nd most common surname in China, shared by 2.7 million people.

Origins:
 the name of a fief (located in modern Taiyuan, Shanxi) granted to Zi Qi, a person during the reign of king Di Yi during the Shang dynasty
 traced back to the Wuhuan people
 traced back to a minority ethnic group in ancient southern China.

Notable people
 Hao Meng (died 196), Eastern Han officer under Lü Bu
 Hao Zhao (fl. 228), Cao Wei general
 Hao Chujun (607–681), Tang dynasty chancellor
 Hao Yaoqi (郝搖旗; died 1663), rebel general under Li Zicheng
 Hao Weizhen (1842–1920), taichi master
 Hao Peng (1881–?), Republic of China politician
 Hao Mengling (1892–1937), Republic of China general
 Hao Pengju (1903–1947), Republic of China general
 Fan Ming, born Hao Keyong (1914–2010), general and leader in Tibet
 Andrew Hao or Hao Jinli (1916–2011), bishop of Roman Catholic Diocese of Xiwanzi
 Hau Pei-tsun or Hao Bocun (born 1919), retired general and former Premier of the Republic of China
 Hao Jianxiu (born 1935), PRC politician, member of the CPC Central Secretariat
 Hao Jiming (born 1946), environmental engineer, member of the Chinese Academy of Engineering.
 Hau Lung-pin or Hao Longbin (born 1952), Mayor of Taipei, son of Hau Pei-tsun
 Hao Ping (born 1959), PRC Vice Minister of Education
 Hao Peng (born 1960), PRC politician, Governor of Qinghai province
 Hao Haitao (born 1968), football player and coach
 Hao Haidong (born 1970), football player
 Hao Qun, pen name Murong Xuecun (born 1974), writer
 Hao Wei (born 1976), football player
 Hao Lei (born 1978), actress
 Hao Shuai (born 1983), table tennis player
 Hao Xingchen, football player
 Hao Yonghe (born 1989), football player
 Hao Yun (born 1995), swimmer, Olympic medalist
 Hao Siwen, a character in the classical novel Water Margin

References

See also
 Haozhuang (disambiguation), villages connected to the Hao family

Chinese-language surnames
Individual Chinese surnames